Pascual Batista (9 May 1926 – 30 June 2004) was an Argentine rower. He competed in the men's eight event at the 1948 Summer Olympics.

References

1926 births
2004 deaths
Argentine male rowers
Olympic rowers of Argentina
Rowers at the 1948 Summer Olympics
Sportspeople from Rosario, Santa Fe